The 1982 Scott Tournament of Hearts, the Canadian women's curling championship, was held February 27 to March 6, 1982 in Regina, Saskatchewan. It was the first time the championship would go by the Scott name. The total attendance for the event was 12,896. 

The playoff was modified for the first time with four teams now entering the semifinal with the semifinal winners advancing to the final. Previously, the top three teams advanced with the top seed in the round robin advancing directly to the final against the semifinal winner.

Team Nova Scotia, who was skipped by Colleen Jones won the event as they defeated Saskatchewan in the semifinal 11–4, then Manitoba in the final 8–7. At 22 years of age, Jones became the youngest skip to win a Canadian women's curling championship. This was the first championship for Nova Scotia and the first of a record six championships skipped by Jones. However, due to career, marriage, and family commitments, it would be another  before Jones would win another championship.

The Jones rink would go onto represent Canada at the 1982 World Women's Curling Championship in Geneva, Switzerland where they would finish fifth and missing the playoffs after losing two tiebreaker games to Scotland and Norway.

Teams
The teams were listed as follows:
{| border=1 cellpadding=5 cellspacing=0
!bgcolor="#0033ff" width="200"|
!bgcolor="#0099ff" width="200"|British Columbia
!bgcolor="#ffff99" width="200"|Manitoba
!bgcolor="#ffff33" width="200"|New Brunswick
|- align=center
|align=left|  Crestwood CC, Edmonton 
Skip:  Cathy Shaw
Third:  Karen Jones
Second:  Sandra Rippel
Lead: Donna Martineau
|align=left| Comox Valley CC, Courtenay 
Skip:  Barbara Parker
Third: Sharon Hastings
Second: Donna Cunliffe
Lead: Sheila Mellis
|align=left| Deer Lodge CC, Winnipeg 
Skip:  Dot Rose
Third: Lynne Andrews
Second: Kim Crass
Lead: Shannon Burns
|align=left| Campbellton CC, Campbellton 
Skip:  Louise Ouellet
Third: Chantel Vautour
Second: Sheila Walter
Lead: Martha Smith
|- border=1 cellpadding=5 cellspacing=0
!bgcolor="#ff5577" width="200"|Newfoundland 
!bgcolor="#cc99ee" width="200"|Nova Scotia
!bgcolor="#ff7777" width="200"|Ontario
!bgcolor="#009900" width="200"|Prince Edward Island
|- align=center
|align=left| Corner Brook CC, Corner Brook 
Skip:  Lori Quinn 
Third: Diane Ryan-LeDrew
Second: Mary Lou Wall
Lead: Karen McIntee
|align=left| Halifax CC, Halifax 
Skip:  Colleen Jones
Third: Kay Smith
Second: Monica Jones
Lead: Barb Jones-Gordon
|align=left| Royal Canadian CC, Toronto 
Skip:  Carol Thompson
Third: Lynn Reynolds
Second: Lindy Marchuk
Lead: Wendy Inouye
|align=left| Charlottetown CC, Charlottetown 
Skip:  Gloria Large
Third: Wanda Aulenback
Second: Diane Bradley
Lead: Irene MacDonald
|- border=1 cellpadding=5 cellspacing=0
!bgcolor="#00ffff" width="200"|Quebec 
!bgcolor="#33cc00" width="200"|Saskatchewan
!bgcolor="#cccccc" width="200"|Yukon/Northwest Territories
|- align=center
|align=left| Laviolette CC, Trois-Rivières 
Skip:  Helene Tousignant
Third: Marie Ferland
Second: Diane Caron
Lead: Denise Grange
|align=left| Caledonian CC, Regina 
Skip:  Arleen Day
Third: Shirley McKendry
Second: Velva Squire
Lead: Dorthy Hepper
|align=left| Takhini CC, Whitehorse 
Skip:  Arenlea Felker
Third: Laurel Baldwin
Second: Arlene Bond
Lead: Beverly Buckway
|}

Round Robin standingsFinal Round Robin StandingsRound Robin results
All draw times are listed in Central Standard Time (UTC-06:00).

Draw 1Saturday, February 27, 8:00 pmDraw 2Sunday, February 28, 1:30 pmDraw 3Sunday, February 28, 7:30 pmDraw 4Monday, March 1, 1:30 pmDraw 5Monday, March 1, 7:30 pmDraw 6Tuesday, March 2, 1:30 pmDraw 7Tuesday, March 2, 7:30 pmDraw 8Wednesday, March 3, 1:30 pmDraw 9Wednesday, March 3, 7:30 pmDraw 10Thursday, March 4, 1:30 pmDraw 11Thursday, March 4, 7:30 pmTiebreakerFriday, March 5, 1:30 pmPlayoffs

SemifinalsFriday, March 5, 7:30 pmFinalSaturday, March 6, 12:30 pmStatistics
Top 5 player percentagesFinal Round Robin Percentages''

Awards
The all-star team and sportsmanship award winners were as follows:

All-Star Team

Joyce McKee Award 
The Scotties Tournament of Hearts Sportsmanship Award is presented to the curler who best embodies the spirit of curling at the Scotties Tournament of Hearts. The winner was selected in a vote by all players at the tournament. 

Prior to 1998, the award was named after a notable individual in the curling community where the tournament was held that year.

References

Scotties Tournament of Hearts
Sports competitions in Regina, Saskatchewan
Scott Tournament Of Hearts, 1982
Curling in Saskatchewan
Scott Tournament of Hearts
1982 in women's curling
Scott Tournament of Hearts
Scott Tournament of Hearts